In the Catholic Church, a Mass stipend is a donation given by the laity to a priest for celebrating a Mass for a particular intention. Despite the name, it is considered as a gift or offering freely given rather than a payment as such.

This is usually a small amount of money determined at the discretion of the family, community or individual in question, and may vary depending on the occasion and number of attendees. As it is considered simony for priests to request payment for a sacrament, the donors decide upon the form and amount of stipend, and are received as gifts.

See also 
 Funeral dues
 Pittance

References

Mass in the Catholic Church
Catholic Church and finance
Catholic canon law of property